Frederick Alton Powers (June 19, 1855 in Pittsfield, Maine – February 13, 1923) was Attorney General of Maine from 1893 to 1897 and a justice of the Maine Supreme Judicial Court from January 2, 1900 to 1907.

Powers graduated from Maine Central Institute in 1871, and from Bowdoin College in 1875, and read law with his brother Llewellyn in Houlton, Maine.

He served in the Maine State Legislature from 1885 to 1889, and in the Maine State Senate from 1891 to 1892.

Powers owned significant amounts of real estate, such that it was said:

He died in his winter home in Florida.

Family
Powers was the son of Arba Powers and Naomi Matthews Powers. On June 6, 1879, he married May Hussey.

References

Justices of the Maine Supreme Judicial Court
1855 births
1923 deaths
Maine Attorneys General
Bowdoin College alumni
Members of the Maine House of Representatives
Maine state senators
U.S. state supreme court judges admitted to the practice of law by reading law